The Fresno Falcons were a minor league hockey team. They were charter members of several long standing leagues in the western United States including the Pacific Southwest Hockey League and the West Coast Hockey League.  In their final years, they were members of the ECHL (formerly East Coast Hockey League). They were located in Fresno, California.

Early history
The Fresno Hockey Club, originally known as the Flyers, was founded in 1946 as a charter member of the Pacific Coast Hockey League, where they played until the league folded in 1950. The all time goal leader is Adrian Marin with 40 goals in a season

The team picked up in 1952 for a season in the Pacific Coast Senior League.  Following just one season, hockey was dormant in Fresno until 1968, when the Fresno Aces were introduced for a season in the short-lived Cal-Neva Hockey League.

Cal-Neva was a loosely linked group of professional and semi-pro teams from around the West Coast.  The league lacked structure, and played games for a selection of regional championships rather than a league championship.  In the 1970–71 season, the Las Vegas Gamblers club was expelled from the league, following numerous rules violations.  The Gamblers were in first place at the time, and all records of games involving them were voided.  The league was dissolved following the 1971-72 season, as league commissioners cited the need for more structure, and without a Nevada team, a need for a new name.

During the 1968–69 season, Fresno's team was officially known as the Fresno Aces.  For 1969–70, the name was changed back to the Fresno Falcons.

Playing in the PSHL
The Pacific Southwest Hockey League was founded in 1972 following the dissolution of the Cal-Neva Hockey League. and the Falcons were one of the league's staples, as the only franchise in the league that was present from its beginning, throughout to the 1995–96 merger that formed the West Coast Hockey League.

The Falcons were the PSHL's signature franchise largely due to convenience and the availability of a then-relatively new showcase arena, Selland Arena in Fresno's Convention Center.  At times throughout the league's history, some games even if not involving the Falcons were held at Selland Arena, including several Championship Finals series throughout the 1970s.

A PSHL season ranged from 15 to 30 games each between anywhere from 4 to 8 teams.  Franchises shifted frequently, often with new teams appearing the next season from the same cities.  The mainstays of the league were the Falcons, the Los Angeles Bruins and later in the league's history, the Burbank or Los Angeles Jets and the West Covina or California Blackhawks (later just Hawks).

Falcons games were often paired with side attractions when it came to teams' marketing, including broomball and roller derby.

Joining the WCHL/merging with the ECHL
Following an experimental partnership with the Sunshine Hockey League in 1994–95, The Falcons became a charter member of the professional West Coast Hockey League to begin the 1995–96 season. The team was a member throughout the league's eight-year existence. During the 1997–98 season they were known as Fresno's Fighting Falcons. Fresno won the league's Taylor Cup championship for the 2001–02 season, defeating the Idaho Steelheads in the finals.

Along with other active WCHL teams, the Falcons joined the ECHL after the West Coast Hockey League was absorbed by the larger league in 2003.

Affiliates

Arenas
For most of its history, the team played at Fresno's Selland Arena, and their green and gold colors and hard-knocks play made them a staple of sports and entertainment in Fresno.  The Falcons were the centerpieces of the league, as the Falcons dominated, winning sixteen league championships in 24 seasons.

The Falcons moved to the Save Mart Center on the campus of California State University, Fresno to coincide with their transfer to the ECHL in 2003.  They played there until returning to Selland Arena in 2008.

Financial troubles and franchise's end
On December 22, 2008, Fresno Hockey Club, LLC announced that the Fresno Falcons team would cease operations immediately citing operating cost due to dwindling attendance, lack of corporate sponsorships and the faltering economy.

President Dave Dakers of the Victoria Salmon Kings ECHL team expressed some negative commentary on the Falcons team management abilities, but praised the team itself as being "competitive". The owners did not do all they could to salvage the situation, according to Dakers and gave up too easily as there were still other options available to minimize the economic damage. He was rather disappointed and not too pleased as quoted in the Victoria Times Colonist newspaper article.

The Falcons were the second team that season to fold, following the Augusta Lynx.  Arguments were made that the ECHL had expanded into markets that were unable to sustain their market, though the perception in Fresno's case was that the franchise had issues beyond that which prevented the team from being profitable.  Fresno was without hockey at any level until the Fresno Monsters began play in the 2009–10 season in the Tier III Junior A Western States Hockey League. The city briefly hosted two junior teams called the Monsters from 2010 to 2013 when the Tier II North American Hockey League expanded into Fresno. In 2013, the NAHL Monsters relocated to Wenatchee, Washington; however, the Monsters continue to field a team in the WSHL.

Season records

Championships
1968–69 San Joaquin Valley Champions

1970–71 Cal-Neva Hockey League Champions

1972–73 PSHL Champions

1973–74 PSHL Champions

1974–75 PSHL Champions

1975–76 PSHL Champions

1977–78 PSHL Champions

1979–80 PSHL Champions

1983–84 PSHL Champions

1985-86 PSHL Champions

1986-87 PSHL Champions

1993–94 PSHL Champions

2001–02 Taylor Cup Champions (WCHL)

2005–06 Pacific Division Champions (ECHL)

References 

Defunct ECHL teams
Sports in Fresno, California
Defunct ice hockey teams in California
West Coast Hockey League teams
Ice hockey clubs established in 1946
1946 establishments in California
Ice hockey teams in California
Ice hockey clubs disestablished in 2008
2008 disestablishments in California
San Jose Sharks minor league affiliates